Marian Pană (born 24 December 1968, in Moreni) is a football manager and former professional footballer. He previously managed teams like Cetatea Suceava, Știința Bacău, Gloria Bistrița, Universitatea Cluj and Farul Constanța. As a player, he won the Liga I title with Dinamo București playing alongside his brother, the midfielder Costel who was also an International footballer.

International career
Marian Pană played two friendly games against Egypt at international level for Romania, the first one was a 3–1 loss, the second ended 1–1.

Honours

Player
Dinamo București
Liga I: 1991–92

Manager
CS Otopeni
Liga III: 2003–04
Cetatea Suceava
Liga III: 2007–08

References

External links

1968 births
Living people
Romanian footballers
Romania international footballers
CSM Flacăra Moreni players
Victoria București players
FC Argeș Pitești players
FC Dinamo București players
Hapoel Haifa F.C. players
FC Brașov (1936) players
AFC Rocar București players
ASC Daco-Getica București players
Liga I players
Liga II players
Liga Leumit players
Expatriate footballers in Israel
Romanian expatriate sportspeople in Israel
Romanian football managers
CS Otopeni managers
FC Universitatea Cluj managers
FC Unirea Urziceni managers
FCV Farul Constanța managers
CS Mioveni managers
FC Bihor Oradea managers
CS Sportul Snagov players
ACF Gloria Bistrița managers
Association football defenders